Silvia is a town and municipality in the Cauca Department, Colombia.  It is often visited as a weekend getaway by residents of Cali, which has a much hotter climate.  The area is populated by many people of Guambiano descent, who maintain their traditional ways of life in the area surrounding Silvia.

There are many fine bakeries and inexpensive restaurants in town, most within half a kilometer of the large public square.  In the last decade, the large trees that formerly grew on the square were removed due to damages their roots were causing, and the square was renovated to include more seating, and replanted with a greater variety of vegetation.

References

Municipalities of Cauca Department